Karl Zsigmondy (27 March 1867 – 14 October 1925) was an Austrian mathematician of Hungarian ethnicity. He was a son of Adolf Zsigmondy from Pozsony, Kingdom of Hungary (now Bratislava, Slovakia) and his mother was Irma von Szakmáry of Martonvásár, Kingdom of Hungary.

He studied (1886–1890) and worked (1894–1925) at the University of Vienna. After his PhD, in 1890, he studied at the University of Berlin, University of Göttingen and at the Sorbonne in Paris, but came back to Vienna in 1894. He discovered Zsigmondy's theorem in 1892.

He was the brother of the mountain climber Emil Zsigmondy and the Nobel Laureate chemist Richard Adolf Zsigmondy.

References

External links
 

1867 births
1925 deaths
Austro-Hungarian mathematicians
Academic staff of the University of Vienna
University of Vienna alumni
University of Paris alumni
University of Göttingen alumni
Austrian people of Hungarian descent
Austrian expatriates in Germany
Austrian expatriates in France
Scientists from Vienna
20th-century Austrian mathematicians
Rectors of universities in Austria
Burials at the Vienna Central Cemetery